High Plains Drifter is a 1973 American Western film directed by Clint Eastwood, written by Ernest Tidyman, and produced by Robert Daley for The Malpaso Company and Universal Pictures. The film stars Eastwood as a mysterious stranger who metes out justice in a corrupt frontier mining town. The film was influenced by the work of Eastwood's two major collaborators, film directors Sergio Leone and Don Siegel. In addition to Eastwood, the film also co-stars Verna Bloom, Mariana Hill, Mitchell Ryan, Jack Ging, and Stefan Gierasch.

The film was shot on location on the shores of Mono Lake, California. Dee Barton wrote the film score. The film was critically acclaimed at the time of its initial release and remains popular.

Plot
A mysterious, unnamed stranger rides out of the desert into the isolated mining town of Lago in the American Old West. Three gunmen hired to protect the town taunt and threaten him; he kills all three with little effort. When the attractive, blond townswoman Callie Travers flirtatiously insults him, he rapes her in the livery stable. That night, in his hotel room, the Stranger dreams of Jim Duncan, a U.S. Marshal, being whipped to death by outlaws Stacey Bridges and brothers Dan and Cole Carlin, as Lago's citizens watch in silence.

The next day, Lago's town council, needing to replace the three gunmen, offer the Stranger anything he wants to protect the town from Bridges and the Carlins, who will soon be released from prison. It is gradually revealed that the townspeople hired the outlaws to murder Duncan when he discovered that the local gold mine was illegally dug on government-owned land and would have to be closed, destroying the town's livelihood. The townspeople then conspired to frame the outlaws for stealing gold as a means to avoid paying them, and they have vowed revenge.

The Stranger accepts the job and takes full advantage of the deal: He appoints a downtrodden dwarf named Mordecai as both sheriff and mayor, provides a Native American and his children with blankets and candy when the shopkeeper refuses to serve them, gets a new saddle and boots, and forces the saloon to serve everyone free drinks. He later orders the hotel owners, Lewis and Sarah Belding, and all the other guests to vacate the premises, leaving him its sole occupant.

Callie and several men, including Morgan Allen, decide to kill the Stranger. After having sex with him in his room, Callie slips out as three men enter. As they unknowingly beat a dummy in the bed, the Stranger tosses a stick of dynamite into the room, destroying most of the hotel, then shoots two of his attackers dead, as Morgan flees, wounded. The Stranger drags Sarah, kicking and screaming, into her bedroom (the only room in the hotel not damaged) where they have sex. The next morning, Sarah tells the Stranger that Duncan cannot rest in peace because the town buried him in an unmarked grave.

The Stranger assembles a group of citizens to defend the town and has them practice shooting, but soon realizes that none have the necessary skills. To keep the townspeople busy, he orders every building in town painted blood red. He then rides out of town without explanation, following the wounded Morgan. As he leaves, he paints over the town sign with a single word: "Hell".

The Stranger finds Bridges and the Carlins, who have just finished off Morgan, and harasses them with dynamite and rifle fire, leading the outlaws to believe the townspeople are responsible. Returning to Lago, the Stranger inspects the preparations — the entire town painted red, armed men on rooftops, picnic tables laden with food and drink, and a big "WELCOME HOME BOYS" banner — then he silently departs again. The outlaws arrive and easily overcome the poor resistance of the townspeople; the defenders are all killed, while the survivors are rounded up in the saloon. 

The Stranger lures one of the Carlin brothers outside and whips him to death, then kills the remaining outlaws one by one. Belding, aiming a shotgun at the Stranger's back, is shot dead by Mordecai. The next morning, the Stranger rides past Mordecai in the cemetery. "You know," Mordecai says, "I never did know your name." The Stranger replies, "Yes, you do."  As the Stranger rides off into the desert, a perplexed Mordecai stands beside the tombstone he just finished engraving: "Marshal Jim Duncan, Rest in Peace".

Cast

Production

Eastwood reportedly liked the offbeat quality of the film's original nine-page proposal and approached Universal with the idea of directing it. It is the first Western film that he both directed and starred in. Under a joint production between Malpaso and Universal, the original screenplay was written by Ernest Tidyman, who had won a Best Screenplay Oscar for The French Connection.

Tidyman's screenplay was inspired by the real-life murder of Kitty Genovese in Queens in 1964, which eyewitnesses reportedly stood by and watched. Holes in the plot were filled in with black humor and allegory, influenced by Sergio Leone. An uncredited rewrite of the script was provided by Dean Riesner, screenwriter of other Eastwood projects.

Universal wanted Eastwood to shoot the feature on its back lot, but Eastwood opted instead to film on location. After scouting locations alone in a pickup truck in Oregon, Nevada and California, he settled on the "highly photogenic" Mono Lake area. Over 50 technicians and construction workers built an entire town—14 houses, a church, and a two-story hotel—in 18 days, using 150,000 feet of lumber.

Complete buildings, rather than facades, were built, so that Eastwood could shoot interior scenes on the site. Additional scenes were filmed at Reno, Nevada's Winnemucca Lake and California's Inyo National Forest. The film was completed in six weeks, two days ahead of schedule, and under budget.

The character of Marshal Duncan was played by Buddy Van Horn, Eastwood's long-time stunt double, to suggest that he and the Stranger could be the same person. In an interview, Eastwood said that earlier versions of the script made the Stranger the dead marshal's brother. He favored a less explicit and more supernatural interpretation, and excised the reference. The Italian, Spanish, French and German dubbings restored it.

"It's just an allegory," Eastwood said, "a speculation on what happens when they go ahead and kill the sheriff, and somebody comes back and calls the town's conscience to bear. There's always retribution for your deeds." The graveyard set featured in the film's final scene included tombstones inscribed "Sergio Leone" and "Don Siegel" as a humorous tribute to the two influential directors.

The 'ghost story' interpretation of the film favoured by Eastwood is hinted at strongly throughout the movie, suggesting that the Stranger may be the ghost of slain Federal Marshall Jim Duncan, returning for vengeance and justice; the beginning and end of the film sees the Stranger mysteriously emerge, apparition-like, as he rides into and out of Lago through a shimmering heat-haze. Upon arriving, the Stranger has a lucid and graphic dream about Jim Duncan's death, in which Duncan declares damnation upon the townspeople for not saving his life. The Stranger's instructions that all buildings should be painted red and the town's name of Lago be replaced by a sign labelled 'HELL' echoes Duncan's dying words that the residents would suffer in Hell for failing to prevent his death. Meanwhile, after spending a night in a hotel bed together, Sarah Belding tells the Stranger of her belief that Jim Duncan cannot rest in peace nor depart the physical realm because he was buried in an unmarked grave. Then, upon the Stranger's final departure from Lago, the midget Mordecai is seen tending to an unmarked grave which now bears the name Jim Duncan.

Reception
Universal released the R-rated High Plains Drifter in the United States in April 1973, and the film eventually grossed $15.7 million domestically, ultimately making it the sixth-highest grossing Western in North America in the decade of the 1970s and the 20th highest-grossing film released in 1973. The film was well received by many critics, and rates 93% positive on Rotten Tomatoes based on 27 reviews. On Metacritic the film has a score 69% based on reviews from 10 critics, indicating "generally favorable reviews".

Vincent Canby of The New York Times called the film "part ghost story, part revenge Western, more than a little silly, and often quite entertaining in a way that may make you wonder if you lost your good sense." Gene Siskel of the Chicago Tribune gave the film 3 stars out of 4 and wrote, "What does work very well indeed is Eastwood's presence, personal style, and direction. Though his laconic sense of humor often drags out the pacing of the movie, Eastwood uses his camera with intelligence and flair."

Arthur D. Murphy of Variety called it "a nervously humorous, self-conscious near satire on the prototype Clint Eastwood formula of the avenging mysterious stranger. Ernest Tidyman's script has some raw violence for the kinks, some dumb humor for audience relief, and lots of arch characterizations befitting the serio-comic-strip nature of the plot."

Kevin Thomas of the Los Angeles Times called it "a stylized, allegorical western of much chillingly paranoid atmosphere and considerable sardonic humor that confirms Eastwood's directorial flair. It's also a pretty violent business that won't disappoint the millions who flocked to the Leone westerns." Tom Zito of The Washington Post called it "an enjoyable, well-constructed work that suffers only from a slightly tedious tone that makes the film seem longer than its 105 minutes."

The film had its share of detractors. Some critics thought Eastwood's directing derivative; Arthur Knight in Saturday Review remarked that Eastwood had "absorbed the approaches of Siegel and Leone and fused them with his own paranoid vision of society". Jon Landau of Rolling Stone concurred, noting "thematic shallowness" and "verbal archness"; but he expressed approval of the dramatic scenery and cinematography.

Nigel Andrews of The Monthly Film Bulletin wrote that "after Play Misty For Me, High Plains Drifter emerges as a disappointingly sterile exercise in style, suggesting that the first thing Eastwood should do as a director is forget the lessons he has learned from other film-makers and start to forge a convincing style of his own." John Wayne criticized the film's iconoclastic approach; in a letter to Eastwood, he wrote, "That isn't what the West was all about. That isn't the American people who settled this country."

The film was recognized by American Film Institute in 2008 on AFI's 10 Top 10 in the category "Nominated Western Film".

Home media
High Plains Drifter was first released on DVD by Universal Studios Home Video on February 24, 1998. It made its Blu-ray debut on October 15, 2013, with a newly remastered transfer, and was reissued on October 27, 2020, by Kino Lorber with commentary tracks and new interviews.

Legacy
American musician Kirk Hammett included a song named High Plains Drifter, which takes its title from the film, on his 2022 extended play, Portals. Speaking about the composition, Hammett said he didn't set out to write a song based on the movie, but upon finishing it, he realized it "conveyed the same sentiment as the film, so the piece was christened accordingly."

See also
 List of American films of 1973
 Pale Rider
 Weird West

References

Bibliography

Further reading
 Guérif, François (1986). Clint Eastwood, p. 94. St Martins Pr. ISB

External links
 
 
 
 
 
 Cast of High Plains Drifter

1973 Western (genre) films
1973 films
American films about revenge
American supernatural thriller films
American vigilante films
American Western (genre) horror films
1970s English-language films
Films about rape
Films directed by Clint Eastwood
Films set in California
Films shot in California
Malpaso Productions films
Revisionist Western (genre) films
Universal Pictures films
1970s Western (genre) horror films
1970s American films